Challenge Records may refer to:

 Challenge Records (1920s), a United States-based company
 Challenge Records (1950s-60s label), a United States-based company
 Challenge Records (1994), a Netherlands-based company